Ḥarb ibn Umayya ibn ʿAbd Shams was the father of Abu Sufyan and Arwa and the son of Umayya ibn Abd Shams. Harb is credited in the Islamic tradition as the first among the Quraysh to write in Arabic and the first to stop consuming wine.

War leader
Harb was one of the top leaders of the Quraysh of Mecca, belonging to one of its clans, the Banu Abd Shams. The Islamic tradition presents him as the successor of his companion, Abd al-Muttalib of the Banu Hashim, as the war leader of the Quraysh. He led the Abd Shams or the Quraysh in general during the Fijar War against the nomadic tribes of the Hawazin. After his death, war leadership returned to the Banu Hashim.

According to the editors of the Encyclopedia of Islam, stories of Harb's rivalry and contest of merits with Abd al-Muttalib are "no doubt a projection backwards of the later conflict between the houses of Umayya [branch of the Abd Shams] and Hashim" in the 7th–8th centuries. According to the historian Mahmood Ibrahim, the rivalry between Harb and Abd al-Muttalib stemmed from the increasing commercial power of the Banu Umayya at the expense of other Qurayshite clans, including the Banu Hashim.

Family tree

References

Bibliography 
 

Banu Umayya
6th-century Arabs
7th-century Arabs
7th-century merchants